Montredon-Labessonnie is a commune in the Tarn department in southern France.

The commune has several shops, a planetarium, a cinema, a tourist information centre, a hotel, cafe-bars among other venues.

Geography
The commune is traversed by the river Dadou.

See also
Communes of the Tarn department

References

Communes of Tarn (department)